The 2005 St. George Illawarra Dragons season was the seventh in the joint venture club's history. The Dragons competed in the NRL's 2005 premiership season. The team finished second in the regular season, making finals but getting knocked out in the preliminary finals against the Wests Tigers, losing 20–12.

Squad gains and losses

Ladder

Ladder Progression

Season results

References 

St. George Illawarra Dragons
St. George Illawarra Dragons seasons
2005 in rugby league by club